Marc Meier is president of Bosch Healthcare Solutions GmbH.

References 

Living people
Year of birth missing (living people)
German business executives
Robert Bosch GmbH